Abdolkarim Lahidji is an Iranian lawyer and human rights activist.

He was elected as the president of the International Federation for Human Rights in 2013, having previously served as the vice-president from 1998 to 2013, and is the president of the League for the Defense of Human Rights in Iran since 1983. Lahidji is a former Confederation of Iranian Students activist and was the student representative in the National Front during 1960s.

Electoral history

References

1940 births
Living people
20th-century Iranian lawyers
National Front (Iran) student activists
University of Tehran alumni
Iranian human rights activists
Exiles of the Iranian Revolution in France
Members of the Iranian Committee for the Defense of Freedom and Human Rights